Mount Tor is an extinct volcano located on the West Coast of Tasmania, Australia, with an elevation of  above sea level.

Geology 
Mount Tor was a shield volcano of the Mount Read Volcanics on Tasmania West Coast. 
The last eruption was 500 million years ago.

References 

Volcanoes of Tasmania
Inactive volcanoes